Aleksandr Antonovich Khapsalis (born 17 October 1957) is a former Soviet football player of Pontic Greek descent. His parents were deported from Odessa Oblast.

At the end of his football playing career, Khapsalis played Indoor soccer in the United States with the San Diego Sockers.

Honours
 Soviet Top League winner: 1977, 1980, 1981.
 Soviet Cup winner: 1978, 1982, 1984.

International career
Khapsalis made his debut for USSR in a UEFA Euro 1980 qualifier against Finland and scored on his debut. USSR did not qualify for the final tournament.

In 1979 Khapsalis played couple of games for Ukraine at the Spartakiad of the Peoples of the USSR.

References

External links
  Profile
 Alex Khapsalis MISL stats

1957 births
Living people
Pontic Greeks
Soviet footballers
Association football forwards
Soviet people of Greek descent
Kazakhstani footballers
Kazakhstani people of Greek descent
Kazakhstani people of Ukrainian descent
Ukrainian footballers
Ukrainian people of Greek descent
Soviet Union international footballers
Soviet Top League players
FC Dynamo Saint Petersburg players
FC Dynamo Kyiv players
FC Dynamo Moscow players
FC Kairat players
FC Elektrometalurh-NZF Nikopol players
FC Zirka Kropyvnytskyi players
Ukrainian expatriate footballers
Expatriate soccer players in the United States
Ukrainian expatriate sportspeople in the United States
San Diego Sockers (original MISL) players
Major Indoor Soccer League (1978–1992) players
People from Talgar
American soccer coaches